MSC Madeleine is a container ship. It was built in 2006 at Guangzhou Shipyard in China, and is operated by Mediterranean Shipping Company.

Design 
Its draft is  when the ship is fully loaded. The maximum cargo capacity is 9,113 TEU and the ship's gross tonnage is 107,551.

References

External links
MSC Website

Container ships
Merchant ships of Liberia
Ships built in China
2006 ships